The 2022 Women's Rugby League European Championship B was an international women's rugby league tournament that took place between June and October 2022. It was be divided into two groups, with Ireland, Italy and Wales playing in the north, and Greece, Serbia and Turkey contesting the south.  

Greece won the southern section winning both their games in the teams first tournament.  Wales won the northern section, again winning both their matches.

Fixtures

North Group

South Group

References 

European rugby league competitions
2022 in women's rugby league